Four ships of the Royal Navy have borne the name HMS Orontes:

 was a 36-gun fifth rate, built as HMS Brilliant but renamed HMS Orontes in 1812 and launched in 1813. She was broken up in 1817.
 was an iron screw troopship launched in 1862 and sold for breaking up in 1893.
HMS Orontes was the former  ironclad . Swiftsure was renamed Orontes when reduced to harbour service in 1904, and was sold in 1908.
HMS Orontes was a depot ship, the former  . Orion was renamed Orontes in 1909 and sold in 1913.

Royal Navy ship names